Nes is a village in Ørland municipality in Trøndelag county, Norway. Nes Church is located in the village. The village was once the administrative centre of the old municipality of Nes which existed from 1899 until its dissolution in 1964.

References

Ørland
Villages in Trøndelag